Vav is one of the 182 Legislative Assembly constituencies of Gujarat state in India. It is part of Banaskantha district. It is numbered as 7-Vav.

List of segments

This assembly seat represents the following segments,

 Vav Taluka
 Bhabhar Taluka
 Santalpur Taluka (Part) of Patan District Village – Kesargadh
 Suigam Taluka

Members of Legislative Assembly
2007 - Parbat Patel, Bharatiya Janata Party
2012 - Shankar Chaudhary, Bharatiya Janata Party

Election results

2022

2017

2012

2007

2002

1998

1995

1990

1985

1980

1975

1972

1967

See also
 List of constituencies of the Gujarat Legislative Assembly
 Banaskantha district

References

External links
 

Assembly constituencies of Gujarat
Politics of Banaskantha district